Gabriël Rau (born 24 December 1998), better known as Bwipo, is a Belgian professional League of Legends player for Team Liquid of the League of Legends Championship Series (LCS). He has also played for Fnatic, where he was a member of the team that was the runner-up of the 2018 League of Legends World Championship.

Professional career

Fnatic 

Bwipo joined Fnatic in January 2018 as a substitute top laner, backing up Paul "sOAZ" Boyer. He did not play in his first split with the team, and Fnatic went on to win the spring split. In summer, after only a week of play, Fnatic substituted out their bot laner and reigning MVP Martin "Rekkles" Larsson in favor of Bwipo, citing it as Rekkles's decision due to changes in the meta. Rekkles returned to his starting role on 9 August, and Bwipo returned to the bench. Fnatic also won the summer split, although Bwipo played in no further games in the EU LCS. Due to their victory, the team qualified for the 2018 World Championship.

In 2019, sOAZ left Fnatic for Misfits Gaming and Bwipo was promoted to full time starting top laner for Fnatic. In the spring season, the team placed third, behind G2 and Origen, and in summer placed second, losing to G2 in the finals. Due to their successful finishes, Fnatic qualified for Worlds 2019, as Europe's second seed. At the World championship, the team went 4–2 in Group C, placing second, and in the quarterfinals, Fnatic fell to the eventual champions FunPlus Phoenix, placing 5th-8th.

For the 2020 season, Bwipo and Fnatic enjoyed another successful regular season, reaching the finals in the playoffs once again before falling to G2 with a score of 3–0. In summer, Fnatic found the same results, and were again swept by G2 in the finals. Due to their consecutive second-place finishes, the team qualified for the 2020 League of Legends World Championship as Europe's second seed. At Worlds 2020, Fnatic placed second in their group, advancing to the knockout stage where they faced Top Esports, and lost in a full 5-game series, eliminating them from the tournament with another 5th-8th finish.

Fnatic struggled in spring of 2021, placing fifth in the regular season at 9–9, and were swept by Schalke 04 in the second round of the playoffs, placing fifth overall. Before the summer split started, Fnatic made major roster changes, releasing Jungler Oskar "Selfmade" Boderek, roleswapping Bwipo to the jungle, and adding a rookie, Adam "Adam" Maanane, in the toplane. In his new role, Bwipo and Fnatic once again finished fifth in the regular season, but this time with an improved 11–7 record, and in playoffs, they won four consecutive games to make the finals once again. However, for the fourth time in five splits, they ended with a loss in the championship game, this time to MAD Lions. Once again, Bwipo went to the World Championship as the second seed for Europe. At the tournament, botlaner Elias "Upset" Lipp was unable to play due to personal reasons, and without him the team went 1–5, placing last in their group. For the first time in his career, Bwipo failed to advance to the Knockout Stage.

Team Liquid 

In November, after the conclusion of Worlds 2021, Team Liquid announced that they had acquired Bwipo from Fnatic, ending his four-year tenure with his original team, and moving to North America to play in the LCS. The season started out with the Lock-In tournament, which Team Liquid won. Bwipo and Team Liquid finished the regular season in first place with a 14–4 record. However, they finished 3rd place in the spring playoffs, losing to both 100 Thieves and Evil Geniuses.

References

Belgian esports players
Living people
1998 births
League of Legends top lane players